Old gold is a colour.

Old gold or Old Gold can also refer to:

 Old Gold Mountain, the Chinese name for San Francisco
 Old Gold (cigarette), an American cigarette brand
 Cadbury Old Gold, a brand of Australian dark chocolate
 In gold mining, gold of any size, found in an old streambed or parts thereof that have washed into the waterway, or gold found contained within hardpan would be considered "old gold"

See also
 Old Gold 1989–1991, a compilation album by noise rock band Cows
 Olde English 800, an American brand of malt liquor